The 2019 Ningbo Challenger was a professional tennis tournament played on hard courts. It was the seventh edition of the tournament and part of the 2019 ATP Challenger Tour. It took place in Ningbo, China between 14 and 20 October 2019.

Singles entrants

Seeds

1 Rankings are as of 7 October 2019

Other entrants 
The following players received wildcards into the singles main draw:
  Cui Jie
  Gao Xin
  He Yecong
  Li Yuanfeng
  Sun Fajing

The following player received entry into the singles main draw as an alternate:
  Nicolás Barrientos

The following players received entry from the qualifying draw:
  Sidharth Rawat
  Fabien Reboul

The following player received entry as a lucky loser:
  Wang Aoran

Champions

Singles

  Yasutaka Uchiyama def.  Steven Diez 6–1, 6–3.

Doubles

  Andrew Harris /  Marc Polmans def.  Alex Bolt /  Matt Reid 6–0, 6–1.

References

Ningbo Challenger
2019 in Chinese tennis
October 2019 sports events in China